The Italy men's national under-21 volleyball team represents Italy in international men's volleyball competitions and friendly matches under the age 21 and it is ruled by the Italian Volleyball Federation That is an affiliate of International Volleyball Federation FIVB and also a part of European Volleyball Confederation CEV.

Results

FIVB U21 World Championship
 Champions   Runners-up   3rd place   4th place

European U21 / 20 Championship
 Champions   Runners-up   3rd place   4th place

Team

Current squad
The following is the Italian roster in the 2017 FIVB Volleyball Men's U21 World Championship.

Head coach: Michele Totire

References

External links
 Official website 

 

National men's under-21 volleyball teams
Volleyball
Volleyball in Italy